Karl Kummer (born 1 January 1904 in Vienna; died 15 August 1967 in Warsaw) was an Austrian catholic politician, social reformer, and labour law reformer.

External links 
 

Politicians from Vienna
Social reformers
1904 births
1967 deaths